Shaghun (also Romanized as Shāghūn; also known as Shāh Khūn and Shākhvon) is a village in Sefidar Rural District, Khafr District, Jahrom County, Fars Province, Iran. At the 2006 census, its population was 249, in 66 families.

References 

Populated places in  Jahrom County